Sapa, fully TTTM Sapa, is the Prague's Little Hanoi, sometimes simply called Prague's Hanoi, the largest Vietnamese enclave, trading center and market in the Czech Republic, located in Libuš and Kunratice  districts. It was created in the area of a former poultry farm around 2000 and is often referred to as a "city within a city" by media. After Ukrainians and Slovaks, the Vietnamese are the third largest ethnic minority in the country, with Sapa being the so called Czech "Vietnamese capital". Sapa offers many restaurants, food stands, specialized grocery stores, a warehouse club called Tamda foods, warehouses, tutoring and child care services, places for meetings, social events and a Buddhist temple.

References

External links 

  

Asian diaspora in the Czech Republic
Czech Republic–Vietnam relations
Prague 4
Economy of the Czech Republic
Vietnamese diaspora in the Czech Republic
Market halls